Asyut University Stadium or استاد جامعة أسيوط is a football stadium in Asyut, Egypt.  It is the home stadium of Asyut Petroleum of the Egyptian Premier League. The stadium holds 16,000 spectators. The 12,000-capacity Arba’een Sporting Stadium and the 16,000-capacity Asyut University Stadium are the largest sports venues by capacity in Asyut.

External links
Stadium information 

Football venues in Egypt